Pseudophloeinae is a subfamily of leaf-footed bugs in the family Coreidae. There are at least 100 described species in Pseudophloeinae, distributed worldwide.

Genera
The subfamily Pseudophloeinae contains two tribes:

Clavigrallini
Auth. Stål, 1873; distribution Africa, Middle East, Asia, Australia
 Clavigralla Spinola, 1837
 Clavigralloides Dolling, 1978
 Gralliclava Dolling, 1978
 Oncaspidia Stål, 1873

Pseudophloeini
Auth. Stål, 1868; distribution worldwide

 Anoplocerus Kiritshenko, 1926 i c g
 Arenocoris Hahn, 1834 i c g
 Bathysolen Fieber, 1860 i c g
 Bothrostethus Fieber, 1860 i c g
 Ceraleptus Costa, 1847 i c g b
 Coriomeris Westwood, 1842 i c g b
 Hoplolomia Stål, 1873 i c g
 Indolomia Dolling, 1986 i c g
 Loxocnemis Fieber, 1860 i c g
 Mevanidea Reuter, 1883 i c g
 Mevaniomorpha Reuter, 1883 i c g
 Microtelocerus Reuter, 1900 i c g
 Myla (bug) Stål, 1866 i c g
 Nemocoris Sahlberg, 1848 i c g
 Neomevaniomorpha Dolling, 1986 i c g
 Paramyla Linnavuori, 1971 i c g
 Pseudomyla Dolling, 1986 i c g
 Psilolomia Breddin, 1909 i c g
 Pungra Dolling, 1986 i c g
 Risbecocoris Izzard, 1949 i c g
 Strobilotoma Fieber, 1860 i c g
 Ulmicola Kirkaldy, 1909 i c g
 Urartucoris Putshkov, 1979 i c g
 Vilga Stål, 1860 i c g

Data sources: i = ITIS, c = Catalogue of Life, g = GBIF, b = Bugguide.net

References

Further reading

External links

 

  
Coreidae
Articles created by Qbugbot